The 2019 season was the 10th season for the Indian Premier League franchise Rajasthan Royals. The team was captained by Ajinkya Rahane.

Background

Player retention and auction

In November 2018, the Royals announced their list of retained players for the 2019 season. The list included Ajinkya Rahane, Krishnappa Gowtham, Sanju Samson, Shreyas Gopal, Aryaman Birla, Sudhesan Midhun, Prashant Chopra, Stuart Binny, Rahul Tripathi, Dhawal Kulkarni and Mahipal Lomror among Indian players, and Ben Stokes, Steve Smith, Jos Buttler, Jofra Archer, Ish Sodhi among overseas players. The Royals thus had a purse of 18.3 crore and nine slots remaining in their roster ahead of the player auction.

On 18 December 2018, the IPL player auction was held in which the Royals signed nine more players: Jaydev Unadkat, Varun Aaron, Oshane Thomas, Ashton Turner, Liam Livingstone, Shashank Singh, Riyan Parag, Manan Vohra and Shubham Ranjane. They filled their quota of 25 players with 17 Indian and 8 overseas players.

Preseason
In February 2019, the Royals announced that they would wear pink jerseys in the 2019 season, changing from blue which had been the primary colour of their kit since 2008. Team captain Rahane and brand ambassador Shane Warne attributed the change to the Royals' home being Jaipur which is known as "Pink City" as well as the response received for a previous season's match in which they had worn pink for cancer awareness.

In March 2019, the franchise opened a cricket academy based at Reed's School, Surrey, England, called the Rajasthan Royals Academy.

Team analysis
In his preview, Shashank Kishore of ESPNcricinfo wrote that while Royals have "great depth" in their squad they "need strategic precision" in the season. He concluded his analysis saying, "Even if a top-two finish may seem far-fetched, they will definitely be in the running for third or fourth." Firstpost stated that Indian players will "dictate to a great extent [..] the balance of the side [and] their position in two months time" and opined that they have the players "to improve on their Playoff finish from last year." News18 termed the "lack of a world-class spinner" as the team's weakness and suggested that the team "might suffer in the latter stages of the tournament" if their overseas players leave for World Cup preparations.

Squad
 Players with international caps are listed in bold.

Coaching and support staff
Head coach -  Paddy Upton
Batting coach -  Amol Muzumdar
Spin bowling coach -  Sairaj Bahutule
Fast bowling coach -  Steffan Jones
Fielding coach -  Dishant Yagnik
Head of cricket -  Zubin Bharucha
Physiotherapist -  John Gloster

Ref

Season

League table

Match results

League stage

Statistics

Most runs

 Last updated: 5 May 2019
 Source:Cricinfo

Most wickets

 Last updated: 5 May 2019
 Source:Cricinfo

Player of the match awards

References

2019 Indian Premier League
Rajasthan Royals seasons